Robert Houston (9 January 1877 – 29 November 1954) was a Scottish footballer who played as a forward for St Bernard's, Heart of Midlothian and Tottenham Hotspur.

In two seasons with Hearts (joining the club alongside St Bernard's teammate Mark Bell) he claimed winner's medals in the Scottish Cup in 1901, followed by the 1901–02 World Championship. The opposition they defeated in the cross-border challenge was the FA Cup holders Tottenham, who signed Houston a few months later; in London, he lost the battle for a regular place in the side with future English international Vivian Woodward and returned to Scotland a year later, aged 30. After that point, no appearances were recorded for him in major competitions. He had married the daughter of Tottenham's groundsman, and later returned to act as an assistant in the role.

References

Scottish footballers
St Bernard's F.C. players
Heart of Midlothian F.C. players
Tottenham Hotspur F.C. players
1877 births
1954 deaths
Scottish Junior Football Association players
Scottish Football League players
Southern Football League players
Footballers from Fife
People from Leven, Fife
Association football forwards
Tottenham Hotspur F.C. non-playing staff